Faridpur may refer to:

Bangladesh
 Faridpur, Bangladesh, a city and district headquarter in Faridpur District
 Faridpur District, a district in Dhaka Division
 Faridpur Sadar Upazila, a subdistrict of Faridpur District, containing Faridpur City
 Faridpur Division, a proposed administrative division
 Faridpur Upazila, Pabna District, Rajshahi Division

India
 Faridpur (Assembly constituency), Uttar Pradesh Legislative Assembly
 Faridpur Village, a village in Siwan district of Bihar state
 Faridpur, Uttar Pradesh, a town in Uttar Pradesh
 Faridpur Durgapur, a community development block in Paschim Bardhaman district of West Bengal
 Faridpur, Sultanpur Lodhi, a village in Kapurthala district of Punjab
 Faridpur, Harchandpur, a village in Raebareli district of Uttar Pradesh
 Faridpur Village, a village in Daniyawan, Salarpur, district of Bihar state

Pakistan
 Faridpur, Khanewal, Punjab Province
 Faridpur, Multan, Punjab Province
 Faridpur, Narowal, Punjab Province